Lídia Sákovicsné Dömölky (born 9 March 1936) is a retired Hungarian fencer. She competed at the 1956, 1960, 1964 and 1968 Olympics and won one gold and two silver medals.

Sports career 
In 1955, aged 19, Dömölky won her first and only individual world title, though she continued winning other medals at world championships until 1967. After the 1956 Olympics, while touring the United States, she and her husband, József Sákovics, a fellow fencer, defected and stayed there for a year. Dömölky worked as a draftswoman and her husband as an auto mechanic. Dissatisfied, they returned to Budapest, where they lived ever since.

Post-sports career 
After retiring from competitions around 1968 Sákovicsné Dömölky received a degree in physical education and a coaching certificate, yet instead of coaching she mostly worked as a sportswriter and co-authored several books on gymnastics and the culture of artistic movement. In 1996 she and her husband spent another year in the United States, as visiting coaches to the Harvard fencing team.

Personal life 
Her brother, Georges Dömölky, also competed in fencing and defected to the United States permanently.

References

External links
 

1936 births
Living people
Hungarian female foil fencers
Olympic fencers of Hungary
Fencers at the 1956 Summer Olympics
Fencers at the 1960 Summer Olympics
Fencers at the 1964 Summer Olympics
Fencers at the 1968 Summer Olympics
Olympic gold medalists for Hungary
Olympic silver medalists for Hungary
Olympic medalists in fencing
Fencers from Budapest
Medalists at the 1960 Summer Olympics
Medalists at the 1964 Summer Olympics
Medalists at the 1968 Summer Olympics
Universiade medalists in fencing
Universiade gold medalists for Hungary
Medalists at the 1963 Summer Universiade
20th-century Hungarian women
21st-century Hungarian women
Women sportswriters